The Eurail Pass, introduced in 1959 and formerly known as Europass or Eurorail Pass, is a rail pass which permits travel through 33 European countries on nearly all railroads and several shipping lines. The Eurail Group, based in Utrecht, is responsible for the marketing and management of the Eurail and Interrail passes. The company is owned by over 35 European railway and shipping companies. The Eurail Pass is available to non-European residents, and the Interrail Pass (introduced in 1972) is available to European residents.

Eligibility
The Eurail pass is available to non-European citizens. The Interrail Pass is available to citizens and residents of European Union countries and the non-EU countries of Albania, Andorra, Belarus, Bosnia-Herzegovina, North Macedonia, Gibraltar, Iceland, Kosovo, Liechtenstein, Moldova, Monaco, Montenegro, Norway, Russian Federation, San Marino, Serbia, Switzerland, Turkey, Ukraine, and Vatican City. To obtain an Interrail pass proof of citizenship must be established with a passport or identity card, or proof of residency must be established with government-issued residency documents.

Age groups 
Up to two children aged 4 to 11 can travel free of charge when accompanied by a full-fare adult. Eurail Passes are available in four age-based categories:
 Child: under age 12
 Youth: ages 12 to 27
 Senior: over age 60

Types

Global Pass

The Global Pass is valid in all 33 participating countries; as of 2020, they were Austria, Belgium, Bosnia and Herzegovina, Bulgaria, Croatia, Czech Republic, Denmark, Estonia, Finland, France, Germany, Greece, Hungary, Ireland, Italy, Latvia, Lithuania, Luxembourg, Montenegro, the Netherlands, North Macedonia, Norway, Poland, Portugal, Romania, Serbia, Slovakia, Slovenia, Spain, Sweden, Switzerland, Turkey, and the United Kingdom. A Global Pass fare is dependent on the number of days it is valid in a period of time. Fare categories are:
 Four, five or seven days in one month (flexi)
 10 or 15 days in two months (flexi)
 15 or 22 continuous days
 One, two or three continuous months

One Country Pass 
The One Country Pass permits travel on the national rail network of one country, with unlimited trips on each travel day. The pass is available in Austria, Benelux, Bulgaria, Croatia, Czech Republic, Denmark, Estonia, Finland, France, Greece, the Greek islands, Great Britain, Hungary, Ireland (the Republic of Ireland and Northern Ireland), Italy, Latvia, Lithuania, North Macedonia, Norway, Poland, Portugal, Romania, Scandinavia, Serbia, Slovakia, Slovenia, Spain, Sweden, and Turkey. Countries without One Country Passes include Bosnia and Herzegovina, Germany, Montenegro, and Switzerland. The passes are available for travel on three, four, five, six or eight travel days in a one-month period.

Reservations

Although reservations for Eurail Pass holders are not usually required for local or regional trains, they are needed for most high-speed, international, and overnight trains. Surcharges are often required to guarantee seat reservations, meals, drinks, and free Wi-Fi. The fees vary by carrier, agent and route, and travellers can usually avoid paying excess fees by taking regional or local trains. Reservations can be made at the station, online on the carrier's website, on the Eurail site, in the Rail Planner App, by telephone, or at a travel agency.

High-speed trains
Many high-speed trains require a reservation. Examples include:
 Eurostar (London, Paris, Amsterdam, and Brussels): second class €10 to €35, first class €15 to €43
 Thalys (Paris to Brussels, Amsterdam, and Cologne): second class €15 to €25, first class €25 to €30
 TGV (domestic routes): first or second class €10 to €20
 Trenitalia (Italy): Frecciabianca, Frecciargento, Frecciarossa, first or second class €10
 AVE (Spain): second class €10, first class €13 or €23.50 Reservation fees for second (€6.50) and first class (€10) are also required on most other long-distance Spanish trains, including Arco, Euromed, Alvia, Alaris, and Altaria.
 In Germany, Austria and Switzerland, virtually all fast InterCity and InterCity Express (ICE) trains can be boarded without fare supplements or additional tickets. ICE trains offer reservations for €4.50 (second class) and €5.90 (first class).
 SJ high-speed train from Sweden to Copenhagen: €7 (second class) and €17 (first class)
 Some scenic trains have a panoramic coach, which requires a reservation.

Overnight trains

Many overnight trains require reservations, with varying additional costs dependent on preferred sleeping accommodation (including couchettes or sleeping cabins). For Flexi Global Pass holders, overnight trains boarded before midnight are considered as one travel day (the day of departure) if the traveller does not change trains after midnight. The pass must be valid for the arrival and departure dates.

Private-rail discounts
Although Eurail and Interrail Passes are usually valid only on the national railway system of the participating countries; many countries also have private railway systems; some offer free (or discounted) tickets to Eurail or Interrail Pass holders. The discounts are normally between 25 and 50 per cent.

Timeline

1959: Eurail is founded, valid in 13 countries.
1971: Student Railpass (second class) is introduced.
1980: Eurail becomes valid in 16 countries.
1991: Eurail Pass expands to the former East Germany, allowing travel throughout reunified Germany.
2001: Eurail Select Pass introduced.
2007: Eurail Pass is renamed Eurail Global Pass.
2008: Slovenian and Croatian railways join, and the pass becomes valid in 20 countries.
2009: 50th Anniversary Eurail Pass, valid in 21 countries.
2013: Rail Planner App introduced.
2015: Two children aged 11 and under can travel free with at least one adult. Poland, Montenegro, Bosnia-Herzegovina, and Serbia join Eurail Global Pass.
2016: Eurail Global Pass covers 28 countries. All passes become available for purchase 11 months in advance.
2017: Eurostar joins the Eurail Group. Youth Pass age increases to 27. Introduction of 2 pass options: Eurail One Country France Pass and Eurail Italy Switzerland Select Pass.
2019: Passes include the Global and One Country Pass Select and Saver Passes are discontinued. First and second class are available for all products except Greek islands domestic. Britain, North Macedonia and Lithuania join Eurail (a British withdrawal from the scheme was announced following a dispute, although the decision was promptly reversed ). The Greek Islands Pass is valid for five domestic trips, and the number of islands increases to 53. Eurail Group GIE and Eurail.com join forces and continue activities as Eurail B.V.
2020: Estonia and Latvia join the Eurail Group.

See also
 Indrail Pass – a similar railway ticket for travel on Indian Railways
 Japan Rail Pass - a similar railway ticket valid for travel on all major forms of transportation provided by the JR Group
 Korea Rail Pass - a similar railway ticket valid for travel on all major forms of transportation provided by Korail

References

External links

Rail transport in Europe
Rail passes
1959 introductions
1959 establishments in Europe